The men's parallel giant slalom competition of the 2018 Winter Olympics was held on 24 February 2018 at the Bogwang Phoenix Park in Pyeongchang, South Korea.

Qualification

The top 32 athletes in the Olympic quota allocation list qualified, with a maximum of four athletes per National Olympic Committee (NOC) allowed. All athletes qualifying must also have placed in the top 30 of a FIS World Cup event or the FIS Freestyle Ski and Snowboarding World Championships 2017 during the qualification period (1 July 2016 to 21 January 2018) and also have a minimum of 100 FIS points to compete. If the host country, South Korea at the 2018 Winter Olympics did not qualify, their chosen athlete would displace the last qualified athlete, granted all qualification criterion was met.

Results

Qualification run
The qualification was held at 09:27.

Elimination round
The 16 best racers advanced to the elimination round.  During the semifinals, although the automatic sensors at the finishing line claimed Lee as the winner with the difference of 0.01 seconds, Kosir challenged the result when the photo finish seemed to show that he had crossed the finish line first. The result stood, but Kosir later went on to win bronze.

References

Men's snowboarding at the 2018 Winter Olympics